Neomyia is a genus from the fly family Muscidae.

Species List
N. cornicina (Fabricius)

N. viridescens (Robineau-Desvoidy, 1830)

References

Muscomorph flies of Europe
Muscidae genera
Taxa named by Francis Walker (entomologist)